The Southwestern University of Finance and Economics (SWUFE) is a public research university in Chengdu, Sichuan, China. The university is affiliated to the Ministry of Education, and co-funded by the ministry and the Sichuan Provincial People's Government.  

The school is listed in the former Project 211. It is a Chinese state Double First Class University identified by the Ministry of Education of China, as part of the national endeavor to build world-class universities. 

In December 2014, SWUFE’s School of Business Administration (SBA) became the first business school in Western China to be accredited by the European Quality Improvement System.

As of 2022, Southwestern University of Finance and Economics ranked # 1 in Western China and # 5 nationwide among universities specialized in finance, business, and economics in the Best Chinese Universities Ranking. The U.S. News & World Report ranks SWUFE at 9th in Asia and 67th globally in Business and Economics.

History

The university traces its origins to the year 1925, when a group of students and academics from St. John’s University in Shanghai, led by the scholar Zhang Shouyong, left the school following the events of the May 30th Movement and founded Kwang Hua University in Shanghai. In 1938, following the outbreak of the Second Sino-Japanese War and the Japanese advance into mainland China, the university relocated its headquarters to Chengdu. This move was mirrored by other major Chinese universities in the east of China who relocated their operations to western China after the Republic of China moved its capital from Nanjing to Chongqing.

After the end of World War II, the university moved back to Shanghai in 1946 and the campus in Chengdu became a branch of Kwang Hua University. That same year, the campus in Chengdu separated from the university and formed a private university called Chenghua University. Kwang Hua University was later merged with other universities and formed the current East China Normal University.

In 1952, after the foundation of the People's Republic of China, Chenghua University was merged with schools and departments of business and economics from 16 other universities and colleges and was reformed as the Sichuan Institute of Finance and Economics. From 1961 to 1978 it was called Chengdu University. In 1980, the People's Bank of China took over the administration of the university which it held until the year 2000 when the administration was transferred to the Ministry of Education. In 1985, during the tenure of the central bank, the university received its current name of Southwestern University of Finance and Economics.

Later, in 1995, the university became part of Project 211. In 2011, SWUFE was listed as part of the 985 Innovative Platforms for Key Disciplines Project, which is an extension of Project 985.

In 2017, the Ministry of Education, Ministry of Finance and National Development and Reform Commission released the list of Double First Class Plan universities and that of the Double First Class Plan (short as "Double First Class") development universities and disciplines. SWUFE was included into the list of China's "Double First Class" development university, and applied economics was selected as a "double first class" development discipline.

Campuses

Organization and administration

Schools

SWUFE's Schools
School of Finance
School of Accounting
School of Business Administration
School of Securities and Futures
School of Insurance
Research Institute of Economics and Management
School of Statistics
School of Marxism
School of International Business
School of Humanities
School of Continuing (On-line) Education
Institute of Economic Mathematics
College of International Education
School of Economic Information and Engineering
School of Humanities and General Education
School of Public Finance and Taxation
School of Economics
School of Law
School of Public Administration
School of Foreign Language for Business
Study Abroad Institute

Research

Institute of Financial Studies
The IFS was established on July 29, 2010. The research institute is dedicated to generating knowledge of international financial studies and the financial development in China. The director of the institute is Philip H. Dybvig. Dybvig is well known for publishing the Diamond–Dybvig model together with Douglas W. Diamond in 1983.

China Household Finance Survey
The Survey and Research Center of the China Household Finance Survey is a non-profit academic institution of survey and research established in 2010 by the Research Institute of Economics and Management at SWUFE. Within a few years, it has been established as an academic survey institute with comprehensive micro data, including three databases on the household finance of private Chinese households, small and micro enterprises, and community governance. The center provides CHFS data to registered users for the purpose of facilitating scientific and policy research.

Institute of Western China Economic Studies
The institute has three doctoral research fields: Demography; Population, Resources and Environmental Economics; Agricultural Economics. Currently, seven doctor supervisors and 21 researchers work in the institute. Economic analysis and policy consultancy are their main tasks.

Rankings and reputation 
Among universities specialized in finance, business, and economics, as of 2022, Southwestern University of Finance and Economics ranked 5th nationwide and # 1 in Western China with a combination of almost 300 million population. 

Internationally, the U.S. News & World Report ranks Southwestern University of Finance and Economics at 3rd in China (after Peking and Tsinghua), 9th in Asia and 67th globally in Business and Economics. As of 2022, according to the Academic Ranking of World Universities, Southwestern University of Finance and Economics ranked amongst the top # 101 universities in the world for "Economics", "Finance" and "Statistics", amongst #151 universities in the world for "Management" and # 201 universities globally in "Business Administration".

Libraries and museums

Library

Southwestern University of Finance and Economics (SWUFE) Library was founded in 1952. The collection has reached 2,000,000 items in digital resources, making it the biggest library in the southwest of China. In May 2002, a Translation Center was set up to provide services for overseas communication and editing and publishing the English version of SWUFE's The Economist.

Money and Securities Museum
The university’s "Money and Securities Museum" was established in 1998 and is one of the earliest of its kind to have on exhibition various real financial items such as currencies, securities, certificates and cards pertaining to planned and market economies. Over 60,000 items have been on exhibition in the  hall.

International relations

The university also has four bachelor's degree programs and two master's degree programs delivered completely in English and these programs have trained several thousand foreign students from over a hundred countries.

SWUFE has established cooperative relations with 130 universities, financial institutes and enterprises from 36 countries and regions, including Austria, Australia, Brazil, Canada, Chile, France, Germany, Israel, Japan, Netherlands, Portugal, Russia, Slovenia, United Kingdom and the United States.

Notable alumni
Jiang Chaoliang (Former Governor of Jilin Province, Former Chairman of Agricultural Bank of China)
Li Ruogu (Former chairman and president of the Exim Bank of China)
Liu Jiayi (Secretary, Provincial Committee of CPC, Shandong Province, Former Auditor general of the National Audit Office of the People's Republic of China)
Shang Fulin (Vice Director, Economic Policy Committee of CPPCC, Former Chairman of China Banking Regulatory Commission)
Wei Hong (Former governor of Sichuan)
 Zhang Zhan (Former lawyer and citizen journalist)

Student life

Student associations
Southwestern University of Finance and Economics has 100 student associations (excluding student associations sponsored by enterprises) covering five domains: thoughts and theories, academic and technology, arts and culture, physical training, public welfare and practice and communication. To name a few: the Research on Philosophy Club, MUN, Starting Point Drama Club, Hip-pop, Green Development Association, Oracle Club, Pre Guide for Career magazine, etc.

See also
Education in the People's Republic of China
Applied economics
List of EQUIS accredited institutions

References

External links

 SWUFE official website
 Research Institute of Economics & Management
 Institute of Financial Studies
 College of International Education

 
1925 establishments in China
Educational institutions established in 1925
Universities and colleges in Chengdu
Project 211
Universities and colleges in Sichuan
Business schools in China